Doniyor Saliev is a visually impaired Uzbekistani Paralympic athlete competing in T12-classification events. He is a two-time bronze medalist at the Summer Paralympics. He is also a two-time gold medalist in the men's long jump T12 event at the World Para Athletics Championships.He is married. His wife's name is Sugdiyona Salieva.

Career 

At the 2010 Asian Para Games held in Guangzhou, China, he won the bronze medal in the men's long jump F13 event. He represented Uzbekistan at the 2012 Summer Paralympics in London, United Kingdom and at the 2016 Summer Paralympics in Rio de Janeiro, Brazil. He won the bronze medal in the men's long jump T12 event and the bronze medal in the men's 4 × 100 metres relay T11-13 event at the 2016 Summer Paralympics. He was also the flag bearer in the opening ceremony of the 2016 Summer Paralympics.

At the 2017 Islamic Solidarity Games held in Baku, Azerbaijan, he won the gold medal in the men's long jump T12 event. In 2019, he qualified to represent Uzbekistan at the 2020 Summer Paralympics in Tokyo, Japan after winning the gold medal in the men's long jump T12 event at the World Para Athletics Championships in Dubai, United Arab Emirates. He competed in the men's long jump T12 event.

Achievements

Track

Field

References

External links 

 

Living people
Year of birth missing (living people)
Place of birth missing (living people)
Athletes (track and field) at the 2012 Summer Paralympics
Athletes (track and field) at the 2016 Summer Paralympics
Athletes (track and field) at the 2020 Summer Paralympics
Medalists at the 2016 Summer Paralympics
Paralympic bronze medalists for Uzbekistan
Paralympic medalists in athletics (track and field)
Paralympic athletes of Uzbekistan
Visually impaired long jumpers
Visually impaired triple jumpers
Paralympic long jumpers
Paralympic triple jumpers
Uzbekistani male long jumpers
Uzbekistani male triple jumpers
Medalists at the 2010 Asian Para Games
Medalists at the 2014 Asian Para Games
Medalists at the 2018 Asian Para Games
21st-century Uzbekistani people